Second Revolution may refer to:

Second Revolution (Republic of China), 1913 civil war in China
Second Revolution (Bangladesh), political hypothesis presented by the founding father of Bangladesh, Sheikh Mujibur Rahman
Second American Revolution, several occasions in the history of the United States

See also
Second Industrial Revolution